Amiga Soccer/ST Soccer is a soccer video game developed by Microdeal in 1988.

Game play 

With the optional Microdeal 4 player adaptor, the game allowed 4 players to play (3 against the computer, or 2 against 2).

Reception

References

External links 
 Game at ClassicAmiga

1988 video games
Amiga games
Amiga-only games
Association football video games
Video games developed in the United Kingdom